Mozdok is a village in Uvarovsky District of Tambov Oblast, Russia.

References

Rural localities in Tambov Oblast